Dothenses  was a population of ancient Numidia whose location is unknown, but it could be located near the cave of Djebel-Taya and Thibilis, in Guelma (Algeria). The existence of this city is known thanks to numerous votive inscriptions dedicated to god 
Bacax recorded on the walls of the cave of Djebel-Taya. In five of these inscriptions is mentioned about the Dothenses community, that would be responsible for conducting the annual offerings to the deity in the spring months.

References 

 Cid López, Rosa María: Oligarquías urbanas y cultos indígenas en el Norte de Africa: el ejemplo de las inscripciones de “Bacax Augustus”, Memorias de historia Antigua, nº8, 1987, págs.133-152  http://dialnet.unirioja.es/servlet/autor?codigo=198347
 Gascou, Jacques: Pagus et castellum dans la Confédération Cirtéenne, Antiquités africaines, vol.19, 1983, págs.182-183  http://www.persee.fr/web/revues/home/prescript/article/antaf_0066-4871_1983_num_19_1_1096

Ancient Algeria
Foreign relations of ancient Rome